Carl Dahlström (born 28 January 1995) is a Swedish professional ice hockey defenceman for the  Toronto Maple Leafs of the National Hockey League (NHL). He was selected by the Chicago Blackhawks in the second round (51st overall) of the 2013 NHL Entry Draft.

Playing career
Dahlström made his professional debut in Sweden with youth club, Linköping HC during the 2013 European Trophy. On 14 April 2016, Dahlström agreed to a three-year entry-level contract with the Chicago Blackhawks. He was immediately assigned to complete the 2015–16 season with AHL affiliate, the Rockford IceHogs.

During the 2017–18 season, Dahlström, along with teammate Matthew Highmore, were the only players from Rockford named to the 2018 AHL All-Star Classic. Dahlström made his NHL debut against the Minnesota Wild on 10 February 2018 where he had one shot on net. He recorded his first NHL point in a 7–1 win over the Washington Capitals on 17 February 2018.

On 27 March 2019, Dahlström signed a two-year contract extension with the Blackhawks. Prior to the 2019–20 season, as one of the last cuts by the Blackhawks for opening night roster, Dahlström was then claimed off of waivers by the Winnipeg Jets on 1 October 2019.

On 9 October 2020, Dahlström was traded to the Vegas Golden Knights, along with a 2022 4th-round pick, in exchange for Paul Stastny.

Following the  season, on July 28, 2021, having left the Golden Knights as a free agent, Dahlström was signed to a one-year, two-way contract with the Toronto Maple Leafs.

Career statistics

References

External links
 

1995 births
Living people
Chicago Blackhawks draft picks
Chicago Blackhawks players
Henderson Silver Knights players
Linköping HC players
Rockford IceHogs (AHL) players
Swedish ice hockey defencemen
Ice hockey people from Stockholm
Toronto Maple Leafs players
Toronto Marlies players
Winnipeg Jets players